Gabriel Moiceanu (born 12 August 1934) is a retired Romanian cyclist. He competed in the road race at the 1960 and 1964 Summer Olympics; he was 57th in 1964 and failed to finish in 1960. In 1964, he also finished sixth in the 100 km team time trial. 

He rode the Peace Race in 1956, 1958, 1959, 1961, 1962 and 1964 and won one stage in 1959 and 1964. In 1958 he won the Tour of Romania, and in 1968 was second in the Tour du Maroc.

References 

1934 births
Living people
Cyclists at the 1960 Summer Olympics
Cyclists at the 1964 Summer Olympics
Olympic cyclists of Romania
Romanian male cyclists
Sportspeople from Câmpulung